Bunker Palace Hôtel is a 1989 French post-apocalyptic film by comics artist Enki Bilal.

Plot
In the imaginary dictatorship of a futuristic world, rebellion has broken out. The men in power scramble to the 'Bunker Palace Hotel', a safehouse built long ago for this contingency. A rebel spy sneaks in and observes the raving of the powerful and decadent inhabitants. They wonder what has happened to their leader, who has not arrived.

Cast
 Jean-Louis Trintignant : Holm
 Carole Bouquet : Clara
 Maria Schneider : Muriel
 Jean-Pierre Léaud : Solal
 Roger Dumas : Zarka
 Yann Collette : Orsini
 Philippe Morier-Genoud : Destoop
 Hans Meyer : Le président
 Benoît Régent : Nikolaï
 Jezabelle Amato : La matrone
 Svetozar Cvetković : Marco
 Snežana Nikšić
 Rada Đuričin		
 Mira Furlan : Luise

Production
The film was filmed in Belgrade, Serbia.

References

External links
 Bunker Palace Hôtel'' at the Internet Movie Database

1980s science fiction films
1989 films
1980s dystopian films
1980s French-language films
French science fiction films
French post-apocalyptic films
Films about rebellions
Films set in the future
Films shot in Serbia
1980s French films